The 2015 Bendigo Women's International was a professional tennis tournament played on outdoor hard courts. It was the ninth edition of the tournament and part of the 2015 ITF Women's Circuit, offering a total of $50,000 in prize money. It took place in Bendigo, Australia, on 9–15 November 2015.

Singles main draw entrants

Seeds 

 1 Rankings as of 2 November 2015

Other entrants 
The following players received wildcards into the singles main draw:
  Destanee Aiava
  Maddison Inglis
  Olivia Tjandramulia

The following players received entry from the qualifying draw:
  Jennifer Elie
  Masa Jovanovic
  Mizuno Kijima
  Tammi Patterson

The following player received entry using a protected ranking:
  Ilona Kremen

Champions

Singles

 Misa Eguchi def.  Hiroko Kuwata, 7–6(7–5), 6–3

Doubles

 Lauren Embree /  Asia Muhammad def.  Natela Dzalamidze /  Hiroko Kuwata, 7–5, 6–3

External links 
 2015 Bendigo Women's International at ITFtennis.com
 

2015 ITF Women's Circuit
2015 in Australian tennis
Bendigo Women's International
2015 in Australian women's sport